Hanuman and the Five Riders (หนุมาน พบ 5 ไอ้มดแดง - Hanuman pob Har Aimoddaeng - literally "Hanuman meet the Five Ant Men") is a tokusatsu superhero film produced in 1975 by Chaiyo Productions of Thailand, founded by Sompote Sands.  Chaiyo's own Kamen Rider film, half of it uses footage from the Kamen Rider X film Five Riders Vs. King Dark. The rest of the footage was made by Chaiyo themselves who even re-created the Kamen Rider costumes for some of the scenes in the film, most notably when they interact with Hanuman himself.

The film teams the first five Kamen Riders (Ichigo, Nigo, V3, Riderman and X) with the Hindu god Hanuman (fresh from his appearance in The 6 Ultra Brothers vs. the Monster Army) against X's adversary King Dark (who appears in his regular giant moving statue form, and alternately in a human-sized form), who drinks the fresh blood of young women.  He captures a scientist and his girlfriend, and threatens to drain her of her blood unless he use his technology to create an army of mutant animal men to confront the five Riders.

Unlike Chaiyo's two official co-productions with Tsuburaya Productions in 1974 (namely The 6 Ultra Brothers Vs. the Monster Army and Jumborg Ace & Giant), this production was unauthorized by Toei Company, Ltd., which produced the Kamen Rider shows. Chaiyo had initially approached Toei, who turned down their plans for producing their own Kamen Rider movie. So without Toei or Ishinomori Productions' consent, they went ahead and made the movie regardless.

Cast
 Ko Kaeoduendee as Koh / Hanuman
Ryo Hayami as Keisuke Jin / Kamen Rider x
Hiroshi Fujioka as Takeshi Hongo / Kamen Rider 1
Takeshi Sasaki as Hayato Ichimonji / Kamen Rider 2
Hiroshi Miyauchi as Shiro Kazami / Kamen Rider V3
Takehisa Yamaguchi Joji Yuki / Riderman
Akiji Kobayashi as Tōbei Tachibana
Chisako Kosaka as Chiko
Miyuki Hayata as Mako
Fumio Wada as King Dark (voice)
 Yodchai Meksuwan as Dr. Ward
 Tanyarat Lohanan as Juree Bay
 Pipop Pupinyo as Hell King
 Kan Booncho as Bandit 
 Chan Wanpen as Bandit
 Somnouk as Bandit

Links

1975 films
Kamen Rider films
1975 martial arts films
Films directed by Sompote Sands
1970s superhero films
Thai science fiction films
Thai martial arts films
Thai crossover films
1970s Japanese films